The Ministry of Social Affairs and Labor is a ministry of the Government of Haiti. This ministry is responsible for workplace standards on behalf of employees and is part of the Prime Minister's Cabinet.

See also
 

Government ministries of Haiti